From Boys to Men: Gay Men Write About Growing Up is an anthology of essays about growing up gay. It was edited by Ted Gideonse and Rob Williams and published by Carroll & Graf in 2006.

Contributors 
Michael McAllister — "Sleeping Eros"
K.M. Soehnlein — "The Story I Told Myself"
Tom Dolby — "Preppies Are My Weekness"
Eric Karl Anderson — "Barbie Girls"
Raymonde C. Green — "Signs"
David Bahr — "No Matter What Happens"
Todd Pozycki — "The Lives and Deaths of Buffalo Butt"
Alexander Chee — "Dick"
Trebor Healey — "The Updshot"
Austin Bunn — "Guide"
Joe Jervis — "Terrence"
Horehound Sillpoint — "The Boy with the Questions and the Kid with the Answers"
Viet Dinh — "A Brief History of Industrial Music"
Michael Gardner — "The Competitive Lives of Twin Gays"
Francis Strand — "Five Stories About Francis"
Vestal McIntyre — "Mom-voice"
D. Travers Scott — "Growing Up in Horror"
Lee Houck — "Inheritance"
Aaron Hamburger — "Whatever Happened to..."
Mike McGinty — "Peristalsis"
Jason Tougaw — "Aplysia californica"

References

External links

Facebook Page
Ted Gideonse's Blog
Rob Williams's Blog

2000s LGBT literature
2006 non-fiction books
2004 anthologies
LGBT anthologies
Essay anthologies
English-language books
LGBT literature in the United States
Carroll & Graf books